Upernavik Museum is a museum in Upernavik, a town in northwestern Greenland. It is the oldest museum in Greenland, holding an extensive  collection of local art. It has its own Museum Board that selects the artists, after recommendation from the curator of the museum.

References

External links 
Homepage of the museum

Museums in Greenland
Art museums and galleries in Denmark